Abuja Thermal Power Station is a planned 1,350 MW natural gas-fired thermal power plant in Nigeria. It is planned as an IPP project.

Location

Overview
Abuja Thermal Power Station is a collaborative effort between (a) the Nigerian National Petroleum Corporation (NNPC), which will supply the natural gas (b) the government of the United States, a donor to the project (c) General Electric Nigeria (GE Nigeria), who will supply the gas turbines and (d) a yet to be identified independent power producer. When completed, the power station is expected to produce 1,350 megawatts of electricity, which will be connected to the Nigerian national electricity grid.

Development
Natural gas to this power project is expected to be delivered via the Ajaokuta–Kaduna–Kano Natural Gas Pipeline, which was under development, as of 2020. The pipeline and the power station are intended to take advantage of the abundant natural gas sources in Nigeria's upstream petroleum operations, and use that gas for industrial and domestic purposes, to spur economic development.

In February 2020, the United States Trade and Development Agency (USTDA), donated US$1.16 million towards the development of this power station.

See also

Azura Thermal Power Station
List of power stations in Nigeria
List of power stations in Africa

References

External links
 Nigeria secures $2.5bn gas pipeline finance As of 24 January 2020.

Natural gas-fired power stations in Nigeria
Abuja
Proposed power stations in Nigeria